In financial economics and accounting research, post–earnings-announcement drift or PEAD (also named the SUE effect) is the tendency for a stock’s cumulative abnormal returns to drift in the direction of an earnings surprise for several weeks (even several months) following an earnings announcement.

Cause and effect
Once a firm's current earnings become known, the information content should be quickly digested by investors and incorporated into the efficient market price. However, it has long been known that this is not exactly what happens. For firms that report good news in quarterly earnings, their abnormal security returns tend to drift upwards for at least 60 days following their earnings announcement. Similarly, firms that report bad news in earnings tend to have their abnormal security returns drift downwards for a similar period. This phenomenon is called post-announcement drift.

This was initially proposed by the information content study of Ray J. Ball & P. Brown, 'An empirical evaluation of accounting income numbers', Journal of Accounting Research, Autumn 1968, pp. 159–178.
As one of major earnings anomalies, which supports the counterargument against market efficiency theory, PEAD is considered a robust finding and one of the most studied topics in financial market literature.

Hypotheses
The phenomenon can be explained with a number of hypotheses.  The most widely accepted explanation for the effect is investor under-reaction to earnings announcements.

Bernard & Thomas (1989) and Bernard & Thomas (1990) provided a comprehensive summary of PEAD research. According to Bernard & Thomas (1990), PEAD patterns can be viewed as including two components. The first component is a positive autocorrelation between seasonal difference (i.e., seasonal random walk forecast errors – the difference between the actual returns and forecasted returns) that is strongest for adjacent quarters, being positive over the first three lag quarters. Second, there is a negative auto correlation between seasonal differences that are four quarters apart.

References

 Do Individual Investors Drive Post Earnings Announcement Drift? OSU Finance [?]
Dharmesh, V. K., & Nakul, S. (1995). contemporary issues in accounting. Post earnings announcement drift., ed 5th, p. 269.

See also
Earnings response coefficient
Momentum

Accounting research
Stock market
Financial economics
Behavioral finance
Financial markets